Yacht Club Punta Ala is a yacht club in Punta Ala, Tuscany, Italy. 

On April 21, 1997 the club formally launched the challenge with the Luna Rossa boat, to the Royal New Zealand Yacht Squadron, holder of the America's Cup.

See also
 Italy at the America's Cup
 Luna Rossa Challenge

References

External links
Yacht Club Punta Ala official website

Punta Ala
Castiglione della Pescaia
Sailing in Tuscany